Van Mieghem  is a Dutch/Flemish surname.

People with this surname include:
Eugeen Van Mieghem (1875–1930), artist
Daryl van Mieghem (born 1989), footballer
Hilde Van Mieghem (born 1958), actress
See also:
Mount Van Mieghem, mountain in Antarctica